Cineplexx may refer to:

 Cineplexx Cinemas, Austrian cinema chain
 Cineplexx (musician) (born 1973), Argentinian singer and songwriter

See also 

 Cineplex (disambiguation)